The 22nd FAP Awards were held on July 3, 2004 at the Cultural Center of the Philippines and they honored the best Filipino films of the year 2003. This is the last time that "FAP" was used as the name of the awards and they were renamed to "Luna" in the subsequent ceremonies. This is also the last time that the old voting process was used.

Crying Ladies received the most nominations with nine. It was followed by Magnifico and Mano Po 2: My Home with eight.

Magnifico gained most of the awards with six awards, including the Best Picture. The Director General's Ball was held in the PICC Forum right after the awards ceremony.

Winners and nominees

Special award

Multiple nominations and awards

References

External links
 Official Website of the Film Academy of the Philippines

Luna Awards
2003 film awards
2004 in Philippine cinema